Bernard Bududira (born Aug 1934 in Mushikanwa; died 2005) was a Burundian clergyman and bishop for the Roman Catholic Diocese of Bururi. He was ordained in 1963 and was appointed bishop in 1973.

References

20th-century Roman Catholic bishops in Burundi
1934 births
2005 deaths
People from Gitega Province
Roman Catholic bishops of Bururi